Aaron Kovar (born August 14, 1993) is a retired American professional soccer player who played as a midfielder.

Career

Early career
Kovar was part of Emerald City FC from 2009 to 2010, and then the Seattle Sounders FC Academy between 2010 and 2012, before moving to Stanford University, where he played college soccer for two years. In 2013, Kovar also appeared for Seattle Sounders FC U-23 in the USL PDL.

Seattle Sounders FC
On January 9, 2014 it was announced that Kovar, along with fellow academy teammate Sean Okoli, had signed a professional contract with the Seattle Sounders FC through the Homegrown Player Rule.

Kovar was loaned to USL Pro club Orange County Blues on June 10, 2014.

In January 2017, Kovar went on trial at English side Coventry City.

Los Angeles FC
On January 23, 2018, Kovar was loaned by Seattle to MLS expansion side Los Angeles FC for the 2018 season. On May 22, 2018, he scored his first goal for the club in a friendly against Borussia Dortmund in the 77th minute.

McKinsey & Company
He is a current Associate at McKinsey & Company in the New York Office.

Personal life
Kovar is of Irish descent, and holds an Irish passport.

References

External links 
 

1993 births
Living people
American soccer players
Stanford Cardinal men's soccer players
Seattle Sounders FC U-23 players
Seattle Sounders FC players
Orange County SC players
Tacoma Defiance players
Los Angeles FC players
Association football midfielders
Soccer players from Seattle
USL League Two players
USL Championship players
Major League Soccer players
American people of Irish descent
Homegrown Players (MLS)